Shibkaveh District is a district (bakhsh) in Bandar Lengeh County, Hormozgan Province, Iran. At the 2006 census, its population was 13,620, in 2,520 families.  The District has one city: Bandar Charak. The District has two rural districts (dehestan): Bandar Charak Rural District and Moqam Rural District.

References 

Districts of Hormozgan Province
Bandar Lengeh County